Chongzhen (5 February 1628 – 25 April 1644) was the era name of the Chongzhen Emperor, the last emperor of the Ming dynasty of China, and was also the Ming dynasty's final era name. It was used for 17 years.

In 1622 (Tianqi 2), Zhu Youjian was created the Prince of Xin (信王) by his elder brother, the Tianqi Emperor. In 1627 (Tianqi 7), his elder brother, the Tianqi Emperor, died, and Zhu Youjian ascended to the throne. The era names proposed by the cabinet are "Qiansheng" (乾聖), "Xingfu" (興福), "Xianjia" (咸嘉), and "Chongzhen" (崇貞), for Zhu Youjian circle to choose from. Zhu Youjian circled "Chongzhen"  (崇貞) and changed "貞" to "禎". According to one statement, the four era names presented are "Yongchang" (永昌), "Shaoqing" (紹慶), "Xianning" (咸寧) and "Chongzhen" (崇貞). The era was changed to Chongzhen in the following year (1628).

On February 1644 (Chongzhen 17, 2nd month), Li Zicheng established the Shun dynasty in Xi'an, Shaanxi, with the era name "Yongchang" (永昌). On 25 April 1644 (19th day of the 3rd month), the Shun army captured Beijing, the capital of the Ming dynasty. The Chongzhen Emperor hanged himself in Meishan, Beijing (present-day Jingshan, Beijing), and the Ming dynasty fell. After hearing the news, Zhu Yousong, Prince of Fu, ascended the throne in Nanjing, the temporary capital, on 19 June of the same year (15th day of the 5th month), as the Hongguang Emperor, and established the Southern Ming regime. He continued to use the Chongzhen era name until the end of New Year's Eve of 1644 (Chongzhen 17), and the era was changed to Hongguang in the following year.

Change of era
 5 February 1628 (Tianqi 8, 1st day of the 1st month): The era was changed to Chongzhen 1 (崇禎元年, "the first year of the Chongzhen era").

 28 January 1645 (Chongzhen 18, 1st day of the 1st month): The era was changed to Hongguang 1 (弘光元年, " the first year of the Hongguang era").

Comparison table

Chongzhen Era
After the fall of the Ming dynasty, the Joseon scholars, due to anti-Qing sentiment and Little China ideology, still used the Chongzhen era name in their country. For example, "the second Jiashen year of the seventy-seventh year of the Chongzhen era" (崇禎七十七年歲次甲申, 1704), "the eighty-third year after the Chongzhen Era" (崇禎紀元後八十三年, 1710), "the Gengzi year of the ninety-third year of the Chongzhen Era" (崇禎紀元九十三年庚子, 1720), "the re-Guichou year after the Chongzhen era" (崇禎後再癸丑, 1733), "the fourth Yichou year after the Chongzhen Era" (崇禎紀元後四乙丑, 1865), "the fifth Bingxu year after the Chongzhen Era" (崇禎紀元後五丙戌, 1886), "the two hundred and sixty-fifth year of the Chongzhen era" (崇禎二百六十五年, 1892), or "the fifth Jiayin year after the Chongzhen era" (崇禎後五甲寅, 1914), etc. This is known as the "Chongzhen Era" (崇禎紀元).

Other regime era names that existed during the same period
 China
 Tiancong (天聰, 1627–1636): Later Jin — era name of Hong Taiji
 Chongde (崇德, 1636–1643): Qing dynasty — era name of Hong Taiji
 Shunzhi (順治, 1644–1661): Qing dynasty — era name of the Shunzhi Emperor
 Ruiying (瑞應, 1621–1629): Ming period — era name of She Chongming (奢崇明)
 Yongxing (永興, 1628): Ming period — era name of Zhang Weiyuan (張惟元)
 Tianyun (天運, 1637): Ming period — era name of Zhang Puwei (張普徽)
 Tianding (天定, 1644): Ming period — era name of Liu Shoufen (劉守分)
 Chongxing (重興, 1644): Ming period — era name of Qin Shangxing (秦尚行)
 Xingwu (興武, 1635–1636): Ming period — era name of Gao Yingxiang (高迎祥)
 Yongchang (永昌, 1644–1645): Shun dynasty — era name of Li Zicheng
 Yiwu (義武, 1643–1644): Xi dynasty — era name of Zhang Xianzhong
 Dashun (大順, 1644–1646): Xi dynasty — era name of Zhang Xianzhong
 Vietnam
 Vĩnh Tộ (永祚, 1619–1629): Later Lê dynasty — era name of Lê Thần Tông
 Đức Long (德隆, 1629–1635): Later Lê dynasty — era name of Lê Thần Tông
 Dương Hòa (陽和, 1635–1643): Later Lê dynasty — era name of Lê Thần Tông
 Phúc Thái (福泰, 1643–1649): Later Lê dynasty — era name of Lê Chân Tông
 Long Thái (隆泰, 1618–1625): Mạc dynasty — era name of Mạc Kính Khoan
 Thuận Đức (順德, 1638–1677): Mạc dynasty — era name of Mạc Kính Vũ
 Japan
 Kan'ei (寛永, 1624–1644): era name of Emperor Go-Mizunoo, Empress Meishō and Emperor Go-Kōmyō
 Shōhō (正保, 1644–1648): era name of Emperor Go-Kōmyō

See also
 List of Chinese era names
 List of Ming dynasty era names

References

Further reading

Ming dynasty eras